Marcelo Demoliner and Víctor Estrella Burgos were the defending champions but decided not to participate together.
Demoliner partnered with André Sá and lost to Facundo Argüello and Renzo Olivo in the first round.
Estrella Burgos partnered with Guido Andreozzi but lost to Carlos Salamanca and Juan-Carlos Spir in the first round.
Juan Sebastián Cabal and Alejandro González won the title over wildcard compatriots  Nicolás Barrientos and Eduardo Struvay.

Seeds

Draw

Draw

References
 Main Draw

Open Seguros Bolivar - Doubles
2013 D